The 1992 Supertaça Cândido de Oliveira was the 14th edition of the Supertaça Cândido de Oliveira, the annual Portuguese football season-opening match contested by the winners of the previous season's top league and cup competitions (or cup runner-up in case the league- and cup-winning club is the same). The 1992 Supertaça Cândido de Oliveira was contested over two legs, and opposed Boavista and Porto of the Primeira Liga. Porto qualified for the SuperCup by winning the 1991–92 Primeira Divisão, whilst Boavista qualified for the Supertaça by winning the 1991–92 Taça de Portugal.

The first leg which took place at the Estádio das Antas, home of FC Porto, saw Boavista defeat Porto 2–1. The second leg which took place at the Estádio do Bessa, saw a 2–2 draw between both sides, with Boavista recovering from a 0–2 deficit in the last 10 minutes of the game, and thus allowed Boavista to win 4–3 on aggregate over two legs which would give the Panteras their second Supertaça Cândido de Oliveira after their first conquest in 1979, also against Porto, in the very first edition of the competition.

First leg

Details

Second leg

Details

References

Supertaça Cândido de Oliveira
1992–93 in Portuguese football
FC Porto matches
Boavista F.C. matches